Samuel Adjei (born 1 September 1980) is a Ghanaian former professional footballer who played as a goalkeeper.

Career
Adjei was born in Accra, Ghana on 1st September 1980. He was transferred from Accra-based club Hearts of Oak to Club Africain for a reported $150,000 on 15 September 2005. On 29 November 2008, he returned to Hearts of Oak for a second spell with the club. He agreed to return to Hearts Of Oak SC on a one-year contract in order to convince then national team coach Milovan Rajevac to include him in the national side. In July 2009, he trialled with South African club Maritzburg United.

International career
Adjei was the first-choice goalkeeper for the national side until 2006, when Richard Kingson rose to prominence. Adjei was named in Ghana's squad for the 2006 African Cup of Nations in Egypt and 2006 World Cup squad on 13 May 2006. Adjei made one appearance on the tournament, as a substitute, when the first choice goalkeeper Richard Kingson was taken off with an injury.

On 24 March 2007, Adjei manned the post for Ghana against Austria in a FIFA International friendly in Graz. He was however injured in a collision with an Austrian striker in the first half and was taken to the hospital. Kingson was brought on to replace him. He was again called up to join the Ghana national team in the 2008 Africa Cup of Nations as the second choice goal keeper, after which he retired from international football. However he received a recall for Ghana's Africa Cup of Nations qualifying match against Congo.

References

External links
 Fifa 2006 World Cup Profile
 

1980 births
Living people
Footballers from Accra
Ghanaian footballers
Ghanaian expatriate footballers
Ghana under-20 international footballers
Ghana international footballers
F.C. Ashdod players
Club Africain players
Expatriate footballers in Israel
2000 African Cup of Nations players
2002 African Cup of Nations players
2006 Africa Cup of Nations players
2006 FIFA World Cup players
2008 Africa Cup of Nations players
2011 African Nations Championship players
Association football goalkeepers
Expatriate footballers in Tunisia
Accra Hearts of Oak S.C. players
Israeli Premier League players
Ghanaian expatriate sportspeople in Tunisia
Ghanaian expatriate sportspeople in Israel
Ghana A' international footballers